Salt Creek is a major tributary to the Sangamon River, which it joins at the boundary between Mason and Menard County, Illinois. There are at least two other Salt Creeks in Illinois, Salt Creek (Des Plaines River Tributary), and in Effingham County, Illinois.

From its headwaters near Saybrook, Illinois, it runs generally westward to the main stem of the Sangamon near Greenview. The largest lake formed by Salt Creek is Clinton Lake near Clinton, which provides cooling water for the Clinton Nuclear Generating Station. The lower reaches of Salt Creek at one time formed the boundary between Mason and Menard counties. This stretch has been channelized so that the modern route of the creek only approximates the actual county line. The major tributaries of Salt Creek include Sugar Creek, Kickapoo Creek, and the North Fork of Salt Creek.

Cities, towns and counties
The following cities, towns and villages are drained by Salt Creek:

Armington
Atlanta
Bloomington
Clinton
Downs
Emden
Farmer City
Greenview
Hartsburg
Heyworth
LeRoy
Lincoln
Mason City
McLean
Minier
Mt. Pulaski
Wapella
Waynesville

The following Illinois counties are partly within the Salt Creek watershed:
DeWitt
Logan
Mason
McLean
Menard
Piatt
Sangamon
Tazewell

Parks and access points
Clinton Lake State Recreation Area
Edward R. Madigan State Fish and Wildlife Area
Kickapoo Creek County Park
Moraine View State Recreation Area
Weldon Springs State Park

See also
List of Illinois rivers

External links

Prairie Rivers Network
Draft TMDLs Salt Creek (Large PDF Document)
USGS Real-time Stream Gage, Salt Creek at Greenview

Rivers of Illinois
Rivers of Logan County, Illinois
Rivers of Mason County, Illinois
Rivers of McLean County, Illinois
Rivers of DeWitt County, Illinois
Rivers of Piatt County, Illinois
Rivers of Sangamon County, Illinois
Rivers of Tazewell County, Illinois

fr:Liste des fleuves de l'Illinois
nl:Lijst van rivieren in Illinois